George Samuel Hurst (13 October 1927 – 4 July 2010) was a health physicist and professor of physics at the University of Kentucky. He was known for patent hoarding and in his later years, was involved in a number of patent disputes through his company, Elographics.

Early life
Hurst was born on 13 October 1927 in the rural town of Ponza, Bell County, Kentucky located near Pineville, Kentucky. His father was James H. Hurst and mother was Myrtle Wright Hurst. As a boy, he had a keen interest in Thomas Edison. Hurst grew up on the family farm and came from a large family with two brothers and two sisters. In 2010, he died of a brain aneurysm and was buried at Oak Ridge Memorial Park.

Education
Hurst attended high school at Bell County High School in Pineville, Kentucky. At the age of 15, he enrolled in Berea College. In 1947, Hurst received a B.A. degree in physics and a minor in mathematics from Berea College. He attended the University of Kentucky and graduated in 1948 with the M.S. degree in physics. During registration at UK, he met Rufus Ritchie. Ritchie became a longtime friend and the two worked on several projects together. After graduation, they both went to ORNL. 
In 1959, Hurst was awarded a Ph.D. in physics from the University of Tennessee with a dissertation titled "Attachment of Low-Energy Electrons in Mixtures Containing Oxygen."

Work

In 1948, Hurst was recruited by Karl Z. Morgan and landed a research position at Oak Ridge National Laboratory (ORNL) in the Health Physics Division. His starting salary was $325 per month. He made significant contributions in the development of radiation detectors and instrumentation, neutron dosimetry and spectroscopy, and field sample analysis. While working at Oak Ridge, he earned a PhD in physics from the University of Tennessee in 1959. In 1966, Hurst accepted a position at the University of Kentucky as Professor of Physics.

Hurst and the team of L.J. Deal and H.H. Rossi performed gamma and neutron radiation measurements at the Nevada Test Site during Operation Upshot–Knothole for the Atomic Energy Commission. For Operation PLUMBBOB, Hurst was again asked to participate along with Ritchie at the Nevada Test Site to collect radiation dosimetry data for human exposures during the tests.

In the 1960s, Hurst along with L.B. O'Kelly, E.B. Wagner, J.A. Stockdale, James E. Parks, and F.J. Davis investigated time-of-flight electron transport in gases. The group utilized ethylene, water vapor and hydrogen to study and determine time-of-flight electron diffusion coefficients and electron drift velocities for these gases. Hurst led efforts to investigate time-of-flight of electron transport in atomic and molecular gases.

In the mid 1960s, Hurst pursued researches that involved electron swarm measurement, swarm‐beam techniques and swarm drift to determine electron capture cross sections in heavy water, chlorobenzene, bromobenzene, ethylene and ethylene mixtures.

Awards and honors
IR-100 Award, 3 awards
Union Carbide, Corporate fellow
American Physical Society, fellow
University of Kentucky, Alumni Association Hall of Distinguished Alumni, member
Berea College, D.Sc., honorary degree
University of Tennessee, Physics Department, Distinguished Alumni Award, 2005
University of Tennessee, Physics Department, G. Samuel and Betty P. Hurst Scholarship Fund; support for physics majors
Bell County High School, Pineville, Kentucky, notable alumni

Professional affiliations
Florida State University, visiting professor
Health Physics Society
Scientists and Engineers for Appalachia (SEA), founder
University of Tennessee, Institute of Resonance Ionization Spectroscopy, founder, director 1985–1988

Patents (15 total)
Resonance ionization for analytical spectroscopy, 1976.
Method and apparatus for noble gas atom detection with isotopic selectivity, 1984.
Method of analyzing for a component in a sample, 1984.
Method and apparatus for sensitive atom counting with high isotopic selectivity, 1987.
Double pulsed time-of-flight mass spectrometer, 1987.
Sensitive, stable, effective at low doses and low energy, 1987.
Ionizing radiation detector system, 1990.
HVAC system. Radon monitor and control system based upon alpha particle detection, 1991.
System for determining health risk due to radon progeny and uses thereof, 1993.
Instrument simulator system, 1994.
Instrument simulator system, 1995.
Touch screen based topological mapping with resistance framing design, 2003.
Touch sensor with non-uniform resistive band, 2007.
Touch screen with relatively conductive grid, 2010.
Multiple-touch sensor, 2011

Private enterprise
Hurst founded or co-founded five businesses:
Elographics, 1971. Developed a version of resistive touchscreen technology. Several patents secured. Electrical Sensor of Plane Coordinates.
Atom Sciences
Pellissippi International, 1988.
Consultec Scientific, 1990.

References

1927 births
2010 deaths
People from Bell County, Kentucky
20th-century American inventors
21st-century American inventors
20th-century American physicists
21st-century American scientists
Berea College alumni
Fellows of the American Physical Society
Florida State University faculty
Health physicists
Health Physics Society
Mathematicians from Kentucky
Nevada Test Site nuclear explosive tests
NASA people
Oak Ridge National Laboratory people
Touchscreens
University of Kentucky faculty
University of Tennessee alumni
University of Kentucky alumni
Inventors from Kentucky